This is a list of ancient Macedonians, an ancient Greek tribe inhabiting the northeastern part of the Greek peninsula.

Mythology
Makednos

Kings

Military personnel

High generals
Parmenion – Strategos of Philip and Alexander and commander of pharsalian squadron
Attalus strategos of Philip and early taxiarch of Alexander
Hephaestion – Chiliarch (after 327 BC)
Perdiccas – Chiliarch  (after 324 BC)
Seleucus I Nicator – Chiliarch (after 323 BC)

Somatophylakes
Aristonous of Pella
Arybbas (somatophylax)
Balacrus
Demetrius (somatophylax)
Hephaestion
Leonnatus
Lysimachus
Menes of Pella
Pausanias of Orestis Philip's
Peithon
Peucestas
Ptolemy (somatophylax)
Ptolemy (son of Seleucus)
Ptolemy I Soter

Cavalry

Hipparchoi
Philotas (after 330 BC, Cleitus the Black, Coenus, Hephaestion, Craterus, Perdiccas, Cleitus the White) leaders of Hetairoi  (1800 horses)
Cleitus the Black, Royal cavalry
Sopolis, cavalry of Amphipolis
Heraclides (son of Antiochus), cavalry of Bottiaea
Peroidas  cavalry of Anthemus
Socrates cavalry of Apollonia
Pantordanus cavalry of Leugaea
Hegelochus, (later Amyntas (son of Arrhabaeus), Protomachus, Aretes), Prodromoi, light cavalry (600 horses)
Calas, Alexander of Lyncestis, Philip, Polydamas, Parmenion–Thessalian cavalry (1800 horses)
Philip (son of Menelaus) (after 331 BC, Erigyius), other allied Greeks (600 horses)
Agathon (son of Tyrimmas), (later Ariston of Paionia) Thracian cavalry (900 horses) *Total: 5700 horses in 333 BC
Demetrius (son of Althaemenes), Glaucias, Meleager, mentioned in the Battle of Gaugamela

Infantry

Taxiarchs of Pezhetairoi
Nicanor (son of Parmenion) 334 BC leader of Royal Agema and Hypaspists (succeeded by Neoptolemus (general))
Alcetas
Amyntas  334 BC
Antigenes
Antigonus I Monophthalmus  334 BC
Attalus (general) 334 BC
Attalus (son of Andromenes from Stympha)
Clitus the White
Coenus 334 BC
Craterus 334 BC
Gorgias
Meleager (general) 334 BC
Menander (general) 334 BC
Peithon, son of Agenor
Perdiccas 334 BC
Philip (son of Amyntas) 334 BC
Philotas (satrap)
Polyperchon
Ptolemy (son of Seleucus)
Ptolemy I Soter 334 BC
Simmias

Navy

Navarchoi
Proteas
Hegelochus
Amphoterus
Nearchus

Trierarchs of Nearchus
Archon of Pella
Archias of Pella
Aristonous of Pella
Asclepiodorus
Craterus
Demonicus of Pella
Hephaestion
Leonnatus
Lysimachus
Metron
Mylleas
Nicarchides
Ophellas
Pantauchus
Peithon
Perdiccas
Peucestas
Ptolemy I Soter
Timanthes of Pella

Various
Agathon brother of Parmenion
Arrhidaeus
Asander
Attinas, phrourarch in Bactria
Caranus hetairos
Coragus
Derdas
Eudemus (general)
Harpalus
Iollas
Lagus
Menedemus (general)
Menelaus (son of Lagus)
Nicanor (Antipatrid general)
Nicanor (father of Balacrus)
Nicanor (Ptolemaic general)
Nicanor the Elephant
Onesilus (son of Python)
Onomastus of Macedon
Philip (son of Antigonus)
Philip (son of Antipater)
Philip (son of Machatas)
Philoxenus (general)
Polemon (general) son of Andromenes
Ptolemy (general) nephew of Antigonus
Sirras, of possible Lyncestian or Upper Macedonian origin, father of Eurydice of Macedon
Teutamus
Tlepolemus (son of Pythophanes)

Civilization

Athletes
Alexander I of Macedon 504 or 500 BC Stadion 2nd Olympics
c. 430–420 BC Argive Heraean games
Archelaos Perdikas 408 BC Tethrippon in Olympic and Pythian Games
Philip II of Macedon (Thrice Olympic Winner), 356 BC Horse Race, 352 BC Tethrippon, 348 BC two-colt chariot, Synoris
344 BC Tethrippon Panathenaics
Archon of Pella 334–332 BC Horse race Isthmian and Pythian Games
Antigonus (son of Callas) 332–331 BC Hoplitodromos Heraclean games in Tyrus, after the Conquest of the city
Malacus  329/328 BC Dolichos Amphiarian games
Criton or Cliton  328 BC Stadion Olympics
Damasias of Amphipolis 320 BC Stadion Olympics
Lagus (son of Ptolemeus)  308 BC Synoris Arcadian Lykaia
Epaenetus (son of Silanus)  308 BC Tethrippon Lykaia
Heraclitus   304 BC stadion Lykaia
Bubalus of Cassandreia  304 BC keles (horse) flat race Lykaia
Lampos of Philippi 304 BC Tethrippon Olympics
Antigonus  292 and 288 BC Stadion Olympics
Seleucus 268 BC Stadion Olympics
Belistiche  264 BC Tethrippon and Synoris Olympics
Apollodorus (runner)  (1st century BC) Olympics

Horse race Olympic Victors as recorded
in recent discovered epigrams of Posidippus of Pella (c. 3rd century BC)

Ptolemy I Soter
Ptolemy II Philadelphus
Arsinoe I
Arsinoe II
Berenice Phernophorus
Berenice II
Cleopatra II
Etearchus 
Molycus      
Plangon  woman
Trygaios

Writers
Adaios (c. 450 BC) epigrammatic poet
Antipater (c. 397 BC–319 BC) Illyrian Wars
Ptolemy I Soter (367 BC–283 BC)  patron of letters, historian of Alexander's campaign
Alexander the Great (356–323 BC) epistolist, rhetor quotes
Alexarchus, scholar, conlanger
Leon of Pella (4th-century BC) historian On the Gods in Egypt
Marsyas of Pella (356–294) historian
Marsyas of Philippi (3rd century BC) historian
Hippolochus (early 3rd century BC) description of a Macedonian wedding feast
Poseidippus of Cassandreia (c. 288 BC) comic poet
Poseidippus of Pella (c. 280 BC–240 BC) epigrammatic poet
Amerias (3rd century BC) lexicographer
Craterus (historian) (3rd century BC) anthologist, compiler of historical documents relative to the history of Attica
Oikiades (son of Nikandros) from Cassandreia Tragoedus winner in Soteria (festival)  272 BC
Ptolemy IV Philopator, wrote a tragedy entitled Adonis, and presumably played the lead.
Hermagoras of Amphipolis (c. 225 BC), stoic philosopher
Samus (son of Chrysogonus), (late 3rd century BC)
Craterus of Amphipolis (c. 100–30 BC) Rhapsode winner in Amphiarian games
Phaedrus of Pieria (c. 15 BC–c. 50 AD) fabulist
Antipater of Thessalonica (late 1st century BC) epigrammatic poet and governor of the city
Philippus of Thessalonica (late 1st century AD) epigrammatic poet and compiler of the Greek Anthology
Epigonus of Thessalonica
Perses epigrammatist
Archias, epigrammatist
Antiphanes (late 1st century AD), epigrammatist
Parmenion (late 1st century AD), epigrammatist
Polyaenus, (2nd century AD) military writer
Criton of Pieria (2nd century AD) historian
Stobaeus (5th century AD) anthologist of Greek authors
Macedonius of Thessalonica (the Consul), (6th century AD), epigrammatist of Greek Anthology

Scientists
Poseidonius, mechanician
Pyrrhus mechanician
Demetrius I Poliorcetes, mechanician
Archias of Pella, geographer under Nearchus
Parmenion (architect)
Patrocles (geographer)

Artists
Pamphilus (painter), teacher of Apelles (4th century BC)
Parmeniskos group potters (3rd century BC)
Aetion of Amphipolis, sculptor
Erginus (son of Simylus) from Cassandreia citharede winner in Soteria (festival)  c. 260 BC
_ (son of Callistratus) from Philippi  Dancer winner in Soteria (festival)  c. 250 BC
Heraclides (painter) (2nd century BC) marine painter
Herophon (son of Anaxagoras) (2nd–1st centuries BC) sculptor
Evander of Beroea (1st century AD) sculptor
Adymus of Beroea (1st century AD) sculptor

Priests
Menelaus (son of Lagus)
Agathanor

Theorodokoi
Perdiccas, possibly Perdiccas III of Macedon c. 365–311 BC Epidaurian
Pausanias of Kalindoia, possibly the same as Pausanias the pretender to the Macedonian throne in the 360s BC
Hadymos and Seleukos son of Argaios

Naopoioi
Naopoios (Temple-builder), an elected Archon by Hieromnemones, responsible for restoring the temple of Apollo in Delphi
Philippus 
Timanoridas (son of Cordypion)   c. 361–343 BC
Leon (son of Hegesander)  331 BC

Women
Arsinoe of Macedonia mother of Ptolemy I Soter
Belistiche olympionice
Cleopatra of Macedon sister of Alexander, wife of Alexander I of Epirus
Cleopatra Eurydice, niece of Attalus (general), and 5th wife of Philip
Cynane half-sister of Alexander
Eurydice of Egypt daughter of Antipater and wife of Ptolemy I Soter
Eurydice II of Macedon mother of Philip
Euridice III Adea, wife of Philip Arrhidaeus
Lanike sister of Clitus the Black and the nurse of Alexander
Nicaea of Macedonia daughter of Antipater, wife of Lysimachus
Nicesipolis wife of Philip, mother of Thessalonica
Olympias mother of Alexander
Phila, daughter of Antipater, wife of Demetrius Poliorcetes and mother of Antigonus II Gonatas
Philinna of Larissa, wife of Philip, mother of Philip III of Macedon
Stratonice of Macedonia wife of Demetrius Poliorcetes
Thessalonica half-sister of Alexander, wife of Cassander
Olympias II of Epirus, wife of Alexander II of Epirus

See also
List of ancient Macedonians in epigraphy

References

 
Macedonians
Ancient